The Victoria Cup was a game or series of games played between professional ice hockey teams from Europe and the North American National Hockey League (NHL). The event was held twice, in 2008 and 2009.

History
The Victoria Cup was announced in 2007 as one of the highlight events to celebrate 2008, the 100th anniversary of the International Ice Hockey Federation (IIHF). The Victoria cup is so named to commemorate the first recorded organised indoor ice hockey game, played in 1875 at the Victoria Skating Rink in Montreal, Quebec, Canada.

In the two editions of the event held so far, different criteria were used to choose the competing teams. One challenger, from Europe, was the winner of the IIHF European Champions Cup (in the 2008 Victoria Cup) and then the Champions Hockey League (2009 edition). The other, from North America, was chosen by the National Hockey League head office from among the teams that open their NHL season with games in Europe. The IIHF publicly stated their wish to have the NHL champion (winner of the Stanley Cup) represent the NHL but the NHL did not agree to that proposal, though the Chicago Blackhawks who challenged for the Victoria Cup in 2009 would go on to win the Stanley Cup later that season.

2008 Victoria Cup

On October 1, 2008, the first Victoria Cup was  awarded to the New York Rangers, winners by a score of 4-3 of a single game playoff against the Metallurg Magnitogorsk, winners of the 2008 European Champions Cup played at  the PostFinance Arena in Bern, Switzerland. The game was played under IIHF rules. Referees were split between the NHL and the IIHF.

The match was preceded by an exhibition game on September 30, 2008, between host SC Bern and the New York Rangers, won by the Rangers. This was the first time a Swiss club played against an NHL team. The Rangers followed the Victoria Cup game with two NHL regular-season games against the Tampa Bay Lightning team in Prague, Czech Republic on October 4 and October 5 at O2 Arena.

2009 Victoria Cup

The second edition was contested by the Zurich ZSC Lions, champions of the Champions League, and the Chicago Blackhawks. The match was played on September 29, 2009 at the Hallenstadion. The ZSC Lions defeated the Blackhawks 2-1.

2010 and beyond
Since the 2009–10 season of the Champions Hockey League was cancelled, the IIHF originally announced that the third edition of the Victoria Cup would feature an NHL team against a team from one of the top four European ice hockey leagues (KHL, SM-liiga, Czech Extraliga or Elitserien). However, the event was not held in 2010, and has not been since.

Trophy
The IIHF commissioned a new trophy designed by GDE Bertoni which designed the FIFA World Cup trophy. The Victoria Cup is a gold cup with twelve Perspex – a thermoplastic material – light blue hockey sticks, six on each side, sitting on a marble case and forming a “V” coming up and out of the Cup. The names of the winning clubs are engraved on the back of the sticks.

Results

See also

 Super Series
 NHL Challenge
 List of international games played by NHL teams
 List of international ice hockey competitions featuring NHL players
 List of KHL vs NHL games

Notes

 
International Ice Hockey Federation tournaments
National Hockey League history
Multi-national professional sports leagues